The Aboriginal Heritage Act 1972 (AHA) is a law in the state of Western Australia governing the protection of Aboriginal cultural sites, which is as of 2022 being superseded by the Aboriginal Cultural Heritage Act 2021 (ACH Act).

The AHA protects all Aboriginal heritage sites in Western Australia, whether or not they are registered with the Department of Planning, Lands, and Heritage. The Minister for Aboriginal Affairs of WA must provide approval for any activity which will negatively impact Aboriginal heritage sites. Under the AHA, Aboriginal sites of outstanding importance may be declared Protected Areas. The AHA also provides protection for  Aboriginal objects.

Juukan Gorge destruction

After the mining company Rio Tinto blew up the 46,000-year old caves in Juukan Gorge on 24 May 2020, which was legal under a Section 18 exemption of the Act, WA Aboriginal Affairs Minister Ben Wyatt started a review of the Act.

The interim report of a bipartisan parliamentary inquiry into the incident published on 9 December 2020, entitled Never Again, makes several recommendations, including a halt to all actions presently occurring under Section 18 of the AHA, and a moratorium on Section 18 applications. It also recommends that the Western Australian Government review and reform the current state heritage laws, and that the federal government review the Aboriginal and Torres Strait Islander Heritage Protection Act 1984. It also outlines deficiencies in the WA Act.

Transition to ACH Act

There is a transitional period of at least 12 months before the ACH Act comes into force, while the various regulations and processes are developed. In February 2022 there was a reference group appointed to assist in the co-design process. The new law does away with the approval process determined by Section 18, and puts traditional owners into a more powerful position in the decision-making process.

References 

Australian heritage law
1972 in Australia
Western Australia legislation
History of Indigenous Australians